The following is a list of diseases in citrus plants.

Bacterial diseases

Fungal diseases

Nematodes, parasitic

Viral diseases

Viroids and graft-transmissible pathogens [GTP]

Phytoplasmal and spiroplasmal diseases

Miscellaneous diseases and disorders

References
Common Names of Diseases, The American Phytopathological Society

Citrus